As Saint Michel is a Malagasy football club based in Antananarivo in the Analamanga zone in central Madagascar.

The team plays in THB Champions League the top division of Malagasy football.

In 1971 the club won the THB Champions League.

Honours
THB Champions League: 1971, 1978
Coupe de Madagascar: 1980

References
Soccerway

Saint Michel